Cycloheptadiene may refer to:
 1,2-Cycloheptadiene, CAS 6577-10-2
 1,3-Cycloheptadiene
 1,4-Cycloheptadiene

See also
 Cycloheptatriene or its theoretical isomer 1,3,5-Cycloheptatriene 
 Cycloheptene

Seven-membered rings